Bayaaswaa (recorded variously in English as Biauswah, Bajasswa, Byianswa or Biaswah) was the principal Chief of the Sandy Lake Ojibwa, whose village was located at either terminus of the Savanna Portage (Sandy Lake & opposite the mouth of the East Savanna River) in Minnesota.

According to William Whipple Warren, based on oral history regarding Bayaaswaa, as a child Bayaaswaa was captured by the Fox and his father Bayaaswaa (I) traded his life for his son's. Bayaaswaa and few other survivors went to Fond du Lac, and the Fond du Lac Band drove the Fox out of northern Wisconsin.

The oral history, Warren continues, recalled a major battle with the Dakota at the mouth of the Crow Wing River. Sixty Ojibwa led by Bayaaswaa engaged three hundred Dakota who they said had destroyed their village at Sandy Lake. Supposedly, the battle lasted for three days. The Ojibwa established their village at Sandy Lake, establishing the Sandy Lake Band, and then ventured to Red Lake and Pembina. Other oral history accounts, however, suggest the Cree aided the Ojibwa against the Dakota. According to Richard Alan Nelson, Bayaaswaa was a jiisakiiwinini (Shaking-tent Seer) and lived to the age of 109.

Bayaaswaa'''s son Gaa-dawaabide'' ("Broken Tooth") later became Chief of the Sandy Lake Band.

Biauswah Lake in Itasca County, Minnesota, is named after him, as is the Biauswah Bridge, a bridge for the Minnesota State Highway 23 over the Saint Louis River out of the Fond du Lac neighbourhood of Duluth, Minnesota.

References 

Ojibwe people
Native American history of Minnesota 
Native American leaders
17th-century births
17th-century Native Americans
18th-century Native Americans